Marcela Sadilová (born 26 February 1967 in Prague) is a Czech slalom canoeist who competed from the early 1990s to the late 2000s. She won four medals in the K1 team event at the ICF Canoe Slalom World Championships with a gold (2005) and three silvers (1991, 2002, 2007). She also won three golds and one silver at the European Championships.

Sadilová also competed in two Summer Olympics, earning her best finish of ninth in the K1 event in Atlanta in 1996.

World Cup individual podiums

References

1967 births
Canoeists at the 1992 Summer Olympics
Canoeists at the 1996 Summer Olympics
Czech female canoeists
Czechoslovak female canoeists
Living people
Olympic canoeists of Czechoslovakia
Olympic canoeists of the Czech Republic
Medalists at the ICF Canoe Slalom World Championships
Canoeists from Prague